Brace Robert Belden is an American podcaster and union activist who volunteered to serve with the People's Protection Units (YPG), a Kurdish militia, in the Syrian Civil War. Belden is also widely known by his former Twitter handle, PissPigGranddad. He is currently the co-host of the podcast TrueAnon with Liz Franczak.

Early life 
Belden was born to Jewish parents in San Francisco and grew up in Corte Madera, California. His father is a journalist at a local TV station, and his brother works in tech. His mother died by suicide when he was six years old. Belden has said he was "a troubled teen" and went to five different high schools, including Monarch School, a boot camp which he ran away from before being arrested for public intoxication in Mission Dolores Park. Belden has identified as a Marxist since his teenage years and protested the Iraq War when he was thirteen. In 2005, when he was fifteen, he and his friends started a satirical right-wing, pro-war punk band called Warkrime. His stage name in the band was President Chaos. They released their first album, Give War A Chance, in 2006, and the band broke up in 2008. After Warkrime, Belden played bass in Wild Thing, another punk band based in San Francisco where he adopted the "'Bad Boy' Brace Belden" nickname.

Belden has said that he "always worked shitty jobs" and that he supposed he "should have gone to college", affixed with the caveat "but a lot of good that did other guys." After graduating from high school, he worked as a florist at Brothers Papadopoulos flower shop in the San Francisco Bay Area. In 2015, he launched a petition to cancel A Prairie Home Companion, a radio show by American Public Media. The petition said it "is a dumb boring show that forces millions of radio listeners under 60 to turn off their radios whenever that stupid old guy starts his rambling crap. All people under like 100 years old should sign this." Willamette Week talked to Belden about his campaign before deciding to hire him as a freelance music writer. In September 2016, Willamette Week received a resignation email from Belden, saying that he had "accepted a position out of the country."

Time in Syria 
Belden arrived in Syria in October 2016. He underwent training at the YPG's Academy, where he met other Western volunteers including Lucas Chapman and Tommy Mørck. Shortly after graduating from the Academy, Belden was assigned as a machine gunner on a makeshift tank for the Raqqa campaign. His unit helped to capture Tal Saman in mid-November. Brace commented that "We pushed up to Tal Saman till we had it surrounded on a half circle. Then we just bombarded the shit out of it." Many refugees fled the town and sought protection behind the YPG front line, with Belden describing "hundreds of civilians coming across for days in a row." At night, his unit stayed in whatever building they had just captured and camped out on rooftops in the cold. "The first week we were out it was awful", Belden told Rolling Stone. After capturing Tal Saman, Belden's unit was withdrawn to Ayn Issa.

In March 2017, Belden was nominated as a candidate for Rector of the University of Glasgow.

Belden was among seven Western leftist volunteers profiled in Rolling Stone in March 2017. He later described it as "pretty fucking ridiculous, man. They just kind of made up my biography. Which is tight, because I've literally done nothing in my life but jack off before I came here." It was later announced that the Rolling Stone article was to become a film starring Jake Gyllenhaal and directed by Daniel Espinosa, something Belden was opposed to.

In August 2020, it was revealed that the Department of Homeland Security investigated Belden and other “anarchist fighters” for “suspected or confirmed ANTIFA links.” In response, Belden stated “I am not now nor have I ever been a member of any antifa organization” and quipped that “The US government has been spying on and smearing communists for 100 years but they usually have the decency not to call a Red an anarchist!”

Twitter account
Using the handle @PissPigGranddad, Belden generated a significant following on Twitter. By the time he returned from Syria, @PissPigGranddad had amassed around 30,000 followers. The account was permanently suspended shortly after Belden's return to the United States for accusations of violating Twitter's policies on "targeted abuse or harassment." Although Twitter has not commented on the suspension, the account was locked shortly after Belden mocked white nationalist Nathan Damigo’s short stature on the site; according to Belden, "alt-right"-affiliated accounts (or, in Belden's words, "a bunch of Nazis/4chan dudes who were mad at me for making fun of that guy for being short") had tweeted about plans to report @PissPigGranddad en masse. Belden reemerged on Twitter under the new handle @PissPigGrandma, which was also suspended.

Because of his widespread following and familiarity to Twitter users by that name, "PissPigGranddad" has been widely used to refer to Belden both in the press and real life encounters with Belden. Commenting on the "pseudo-celebrity" he had acquired under that name, Belden said "I kind of wish I hadn't made my name PissPigGranddad. I picked it before I ever thought anyone would say it to me out loud."

Unionization effort
In February 2018, Belden began working in San Francisco at Anchor Brewing Company, which had recently been purchased by Sapporo. As a member of the Democratic Socialists of America, specifically the local Marxist caucus Red Star, he became part of an eight-person organizing committee to form an employee's union at his factory. By early 2019, the unionization effort had gone public and was profiled in Jacobin magazine and an episode of Chapo Trap House. Workers at the brewery voted 31 to 16 in favor of unionizing, and they joined the International Longshore and Warehouse Union Local 6. In August 2019, Senator Bernie Sanders spoke with Belden and other union activists about workplace democracy and labor issues.

References 

1989 births
Jewish American activists
American communists
American Marxists
Communists from California
Members of the Democratic Socialists of America
American music critics
American music journalists
American punk rock musicians
International Longshore and Warehouse Union people
Jewish socialists
Living people
People's Protection Units
American podcasters
Activists from San Francisco
Jews in punk rock
People from Corte Madera, California
American anti–Iraq War activists
Jewish American trade unionists
Brewery workers